Against the World is the third studio album by American deathcore band Winds of Plague. It was released on April 19, 2011 through Century Media Records. Against the World features guest appearances from members of Hatebreed, Terror, For Today, Stray from the Path, and retired professional wrestler The Ultimate Warrior (who performs a spoken-word track entitled "The Warrior Code"). The album is described in a press release as "the heaviest-hitting record of the band's already heralded career." "Refined in the Fire" and "California" have been released as singles, and music videos have been released for "Drop the Match", "California", and "Refined in the Fire", breaking the band's prior pattern of having no more than one video released per album. An unreleased song, a cover of The Cranberries song "Zombie", was released with the iTunes Store EP for "California". Against the World charted at number 60 on the Billboard 200, making it Winds of Plague's highest charting album.

Track listing

Personnel
Winds of Plague
 Jonathan "Johnny Plague" Cooke-Hayden – vocals
 Nick Eash – lead guitar
 Nick Piunno – rhythm guitar
 Andrew Glover – bass, engineering
 Art Cruz – drums, percussion
 Alana Potocnik – keyboards

Additional musicians
 Jamey Jasta of Hatebreed – guest vocals on track 4
 Mattie Montgomery of For Today – guest vocals on track 5
 The Ultimate Warrior – guest vocals on track 6
 Drew York of Stray from the Path – guest vocals on track 8
 Martin Stewart of Terror – guest vocals on track 11
 John Mishima – guest vocals on track 11

Additional personnel
 Matt Hyde – production, engineering
 Sid Garcia and Chris Rakestraw – engineering
 Brian Lawlor and Ryan Kelly – orchestral arrangements
 Pär Olofsson – artwork
 Daniel McBride – layout

Charts

References

2011 albums
Winds of Plague albums
Century Media Records albums
Albums with cover art by Pär Olofsson